is a male badminton player from Japan.

Career
Otsuka competed in badminton at the 2004 Summer Olympics in men's doubles with partner Keita Masuda.  They had a bye in the first round, then were defeated in the round of 16 by Fu Haifeng and Cai Yun of China.
He also competed in mixed doubles with partner Shizuka Yamamoto.  They were defeated in the round of 32 by Robert Blair and Natalie Munt of Great Britain.

Ohtsuka played at the 2007 BWF World Championships in men's doubles with Keita Masuda, and were defeated in the third round by the eventual champions Markis Kido and Hendra Setiawan, of Indonesia, 22-20, 21-19.

External links
 BWF Player Profile

1978 births
Living people
People from Nagasaki
Olympic badminton players of Japan
Japanese male badminton players
Badminton players at the 2004 Summer Olympics
Badminton players at the 2008 Summer Olympics
Nippon Sport Science University alumni
Badminton players at the 2006 Asian Games
Badminton players at the 2002 Asian Games
Asian Games competitors for Japan